Usue Maitane Arconada and Caroline Dolehide were the defending champions but chose to participate with different partners. Arconada partnered Marta Kostyuk but lost in the first round to Francesca Di Lorenzo and Jamie Loeb. Dolehide partnered Caty McNally, but lost in the semifinals to Magdalena Fręch and Katarzyna Kawa.

Fręch and Kawa went on to win the title, defeating Di Lorenzo and Loeb in the final, 7–5, 6–1.

Seeds

Draw

Draw

References
 2020 Mercer Tennis Classic at ITFtennis.com
 Official website

Mercer Tennis Classic - Doubles